Itagüí is a station on line A of the Medellín Metro going south. It is named after the city where it is located, Itagüí. The station was opened on 30 September 1996 as the terminus of the extension of the line from Poblado. On 17 September 2012, the line was extended to La Estrella.

In 2012, the second expansion of line A took place. Before the second expansion of the Medellín Metro, this was a terminal station for line A.

References

External links
 Official site of Medellín Metro 

Medellín Metro stations
Railway stations opened in 1996
1996 establishments in Colombia